Dame Pamela Louise Makin, DBE (born November 1960) is a British businesswoman.

Early life
Pamela Louise Makin was born in November 1960. She attended The Queen's School, Chester before going on to receive an MA in Natural Sciences and a PhD in Metallurgy, both from the University of Cambridge (Newnham College and St John's College), and an MBA.

Career
Makin was the chief executive officer of BTG PLC from 17 September  2004 To 2019.  She served as the president for biopharmaceuticals Europe at Baxter Healthcare since 2001, where she was responsible for sales in Europe, Africa and the Middle East. Makin joined Baxter Healthcare in 2000 as vice president of strategy and business development Europe.

Before joining Baxter, she was a director for global ceramics of English China Clay and prior to that she held a variety of roles at ICI between 1985 and 1998.

She has been a non-executive director of Intertek Group plc since 1 July 2012, a non-executive director of the Woodford Patient Capital Trust, a trustee of the Outward Bound Trust, and chair of the 1851 Trust. She was previously a non-executive director at Premier Foods from October 2006 to September 2012.

Honours
In the 2014 Birthday Honours, she was made a Dame Commander of the Order of the British Empire.

She is an honorary fellow of St. John’s College, Cambridge.

References

1960 births
Living people
Alumni of St John's College, Cambridge
British chief executives
Commanders of the Order of the British Empire
Women chief executives
Date of birth missing (living people)
Place of birth missing (living people)